Lovin is a  surname. And also used as name in tribal state of Arunachal Pradesh India. Example Lovin Tamin

Notable people with this surname include:
 Fița Lovin (born 1951), Romanian middle-distance runner
 Florin Lovin (born 1982), Romanian footballer

See also
 Lowin (surname)
 Loving (disambiguation)
 Lovi (disambiguation)

Surnames of Romanian origin